This is a list of the European Routes, or E-road highways, that run through the Bosnia and Herzegovina. The current network is signposted according to the 2016 system revision, and contains seven Class A roads and three Class B roads within the country.

Most of the roads are motorways that also carry various national A-numbers (for Autocesta), and there are several state roads with M-numbers (for Magistralna cesta).

Class-A European routes

Class-B European routes

See also 
 A1 (Bosnia and Herzegovina)
 Roads in Bosnia and Herzegovina
 Ministry of Communication and Traffic (Bosnia and Herzegovina)

External links 
JP Autoceste FBiH
JP Autoputevi RS
JP Ceste Federacije BiH
JP Putevi RS

References 

Bosnia and Herzegovina
Road transport in Bosnia and Herzegovina